The Utah Valley Wolverines women's basketball team is the basketball team that represents Utah Valley University in Orem, Utah, United States. The school's team currently competes in the Western Athletic Conference.

History
Utah Valley began play in 1979 as a member of NJCAA. They joined Division I in 2003. As of the end of the 2015–16 season, they have an all-time record in Division I of 109-135. They have never reached the NCAA Tournament, due to the Great West Conference (their previous conference before joining the WAC in 2013) not getting an automatic bid to a postseason tournament. They won the 2010 Great West Conference women's basketball tournament, finishing runner-up in 2012 and 2013. In 2021, the Wolverines made their first appearance in the NCAA tournament after WAC champion, Cal Baptist couldn't participate due to being in the middle of a transition from Division II.

NCAA Tournament appearances
The Wolverines have appeared in one NCAA Division I women's basketball tournament and have an overall record of 0–1.

References

External links
 

 
1979 establishments in Utah